The 1964–65 season was the 50th in the history of the Isthmian League, an English football competition.

At the end of the previous season Wimbledon switched to the Southern Football League, while the Athenian League club Wealdstone were newly admitted.

Hendon were champions after beating Enfield in a championship play-off.

League table

References

Isthmian League seasons
I